Wayne Slattery is a former professional Australian rules footballer who played for South Adelaide Football Club in the South Australian National Football League (SANFL) and St Kilda Football Club in the Victorian Football League (VFL).

Slattery debuted with South Adelaide in 1977 as a sixteen-year-old and played in the 1979 SANFL Grand Final, which South Adelaide lost to Port Adelaide Football Club. VFL club St Kilda recruited him for the 1982 season but injuries restricted Slattery to 11 games.

Slattery returned to South Adelaide in 1983, and left at the end of 1986, having played a total of 170 SANFL games for the club.

He transferred to the North Adelaide Football Club in 1987 and was a member of their premiership team that year. He retired after the 1988 pre-season cup, having played 19 games for the club.

Slattery's son Tyson Slattery played for Australian Football League (AFL) club Essendon.

References

External links

Australian rules footballers from South Australia
St Kilda Football Club players
South Adelaide Football Club players
1960 births
Living people